The Deccan States Agency, also known as the Deccan States Agency and Kolhapur Residency, was a political agency of British India, managing the relations of the British government of the Bombay Presidency with a collection of princely states and jagirs (feudal 'vassal' estates) in western India.

History 
The agency was created 1933 with the merger of the Kolhapur Agency (Kolhapur Residency), Poona Agency, Bijapur Agency, Dharwar Agency and Kolaba Agency.

It was composed of a number of princely states and jagirs in Western India, located in the present-day Indian states of Maharashtra and Karnataka, six of which were Salute states. The princely states included in the agency were under the suzerainty, but not the control, of the British authorities of the Bombay Presidency.

After Indian Independence in 1947, the states all acceded to the Dominion of India, and were integrated into the Indian state of Bombay. In 1956 the Kannada language speaking southern portion of Bombay state, which included the former states of the Southern Maratha Country, was transferred to Mysore State (later renamed Karnataka). Bombay State was divided into the new states of Maharashtra and Gujarat in 1960.

Princely (e)states

States of the former Kolhapur Agency 
Salute states, by precedence :
 Kolhapur, title Maharaja; Hereditary 19-guns salute
 Janjira, title Nawab; Hereditary 11-guns (13-guns local):
 Sangli, title Raja; Hereditary 9-guns (11-guns personal)
 Mudhol, title Raja; Hereditary 9-guns

Non-salute states, alphabetically :

 Akalkot, title Raja 
 Aundh, title Pant Pratinidhi
 Jamkhandi, title Raja
 Kurundwad Junior, title Rao
 Kurundwad Senior, title Rao
 Miraj Junior, title Rao
 Miraj Senior, title Rao
 Phaltan, title Naik
 Ramdurg, title Raja

Jagirs of the former Kolhapur Agency 

 Bavda estate 
 Gajendragad (Gajendragarh)
? Nesri 
? Himmat Bahadur 
 Ichalkaranji estate
 Kagal Junior 
 Kagal Senior 
 Kapshi estate 
 Latur estate
 Sar Lashkar Khardekar  
 Torgal Jagir
 Vishalgad estate

States of the other former colonial agencies 
Former Bijapur Agency, both non-salute :
 Daphlapur (Daflepur), title Deshmukh (1917 incorporated in Jath, below)
 Jath (Joth), title Raja (till 1936 Deshmukh)

Former Kolaba Agency:
 Sawantwadi (Savantwadi), title title Raja Bahadur; Hereditary salute of 9-guns (11-guns local)

Former Dharwar Agency : non-salute :
 Savanur, title Nawab

Former Poona Agency :
 Bhor, title Raja, Hereditary salute of 9-guns

See also 
 List of Maratha dynasties and states
 Maratha Empire

References 

Agencies of British India
Historical Indian regions
Bombay Presidency
Deccan Plateau